Fred W. Hastings (October 18, 1882 – December 18, 1932) was an American politician in the state of Washington. He served in the Washington State Senate and Washington House of Representatives. From 1929 to 1931, he was President pro tempore of the Senate. He died in 1932.

References

Republican Party Washington (state) state senators
1882 births
1932 deaths
20th-century American politicians
Republican Party members of the Washington House of Representatives